WYNN may refer to:

 WYNN (AM), a radio station (540 AM) licensed to Florence, South Carolina, United States
 WYNN-FM, a radio station (106.3 FM) licensed to Florence, South Carolina, United States
 NASDAQ symbol for Wynn Resorts

See also
 Wynn (disambiguation)